CD-17 was a C Type class escort ship (Kaibōkan) of the Imperial Japanese Navy during the Second World War.

History
CD-17 was laid down by Nippon Kokan K. K. at their Tsurumi Shipyard on 15 December 1943, launched on 26 February 1944, and completed and commissioned on 13 April 1944. During the war CD-17 was mostly busy on escort duties.

On 12 January 1945, off Cape St. Jacques in the South China Sea, CD-17 was attacked by aircraft from the USS Lexington (CV-16), USS Hancock (CV-19) and USS Hornet (CV-12) which were part of Vice Admiral John S. McCain, Sr.'s Task Force 38 that had entered the South China Sea to raid Japanese shipping. She received three torpedo hits and sank at 0952. 159 crewman including 12 officers were killed. CD-19 and Chiburi were also sunk. 

CD-17 was struck from the Navy List on 10 March 1945.

References

Additional sources

1944 ships
Ships built in Japan
Type C escort ships
Maritime incidents in January 1945
World War II shipwrecks in the Sea of Japan
Ships sunk by US aircraft